The Accademia di Belle Arti di Foggia is an academy of fine arts located in Foggia, Italy. It was founded in 1970.

References

External links
  

Art schools in Italy
Education in Apulia
Foggia
Educational institutions established in 1970
1970 establishments in Italy